Mark Blake (born 9 September 1985) is a former Australian rules footballer for the Geelong Football Club in the Australian Football League (AFL).

Career
Blake was drafted in the 2003 AFL Draft under the father-son rule, he debuted in 2005 in a losing game in front of a crowd of 28,165 at the SCG. Blake kicked his first two career goals against Richmond at Skilled Stadium in round 18, 2007.

After having little impact in the 2007 preliminary final against Collingwood, Blake was dropped on the eve of the 2007 AFL Grand Final for former Geelong captain and ruckman, Steven King.

2008 was a successful year for Blake, seeing him permanently become a part of Geelong's ruck duo along with Brad Ottens. Blake developed as a footballer substantially in 2008 and has improved his around the ground work.

2011 was a terrible year for Blake, getting no AFL appearances and was said to be trade bait. On 19 October 2011 Blake announced his retirement, effective immediately.

Personal life
Blake attended high school at Belmont High in Geelong, and played grassroots football for South Barwon in the Geelong Football League.

Statistics

|- style="background-color: #EAEAEA"
! scope="row" style="text-align:center" | 2004
|
| 24 || 0 || — || — || — || — || — || — || — || — || — || — || — || — || — || — || — || —
|-
! scope="row" style="text-align:center" | 2005
|
| 24 || 3 || 0 || 0 || 7 || 11 || 18 || 6 || 1 || 27 || 0.0 || 0.0 || 2.3 || 3.7 || 6.0 || 2.0 || 0.3 || 9.0
|- style="background-color: #EAEAEA"
! scope="row" style="text-align:center" | 2006
|
| 24 || 8 || 0 || 0 || 12 || 45 || 57 || 16 || 9 || 97 || 0.0 || 0.0 || 1.5 || 5.6 || 7.1 || 2.0 || 1.1 || 12.1
|-
! scope="row" style="text-align:center" | 2007
|
| 24 || 22 || 2 || 6 || 62 || 147 || 209 || 65 || 26 || 379 || 0.1 || 0.3 || 2.8 || 6.7 || 9.5 || 3.0 || 1.2 || 17.2
|- style="background-color: #EAEAEA"
! scope="row" style="text-align:center" | 2008
|
| 24 || 25 || 6 || 6 || 77 || 179 || 256 || 87 || 22 || 525 || 0.2 || 0.2 || 3.1 || 7.2 || 10.2 || 3.5 || 0.9 || 21.0
|-
! scope="row" style="text-align:center" | 2009
|
| 24 || 21 || 3 || 2 || 47 || 149 || 196 || 46 || 25 || 482 || 0.1 || 0.1 || 2.2 || 7.1 || 9.3 || 2.2 || 1.2 || 23.0
|- style="background-color: #EAEAEA"
! scope="row" style="text-align:center" | 2010
|
| 24 || 20 || 1 || 2 || 43 || 156 || 199 || 45 || 13 || 379 || 0.1 || 0.1 || 2.2 || 7.8 || 10.0 || 2.3 || 0.7 || 19.0
|-
! scope="row" style="text-align:center" | 2011
|
| 24 || 0 || — || — || — || — || — || — || — || — || — || — || — || — || — || — || — || —
|- class="sortbottom"
! colspan=3| Career
! 99
! 12
! 16
! 248
! 687
! 935
! 265
! 96
! 1889
! 0.1
! 0.2
! 2.5
! 6.9
! 9.4
! 2.7
! 1.0
! 19.1
|}

Honours and achievements

Team
 AFL Premiership (Geelong): 2009
 AFL McClelland Trophy (Geelong): 2007, 2008
 AFL NAB Cup (Geelong): 2006, 2009

Individual
 Vic Country representative honours at the AFL Under 18 Championships: 2003

References

External links

 
 

Australian rules footballers from Geelong
Geelong Football Club players
Geelong Football Club Premiership players
Geelong Falcons players
South Barwon Football Club players
1985 births
Living people
St Mary's Football Club (NTFL) players
Aberfeldie Football Club players
Mooroopna Football Club players
One-time VFL/AFL Premiership players